Yoo Han-joon (Hangul: 유한준, Hanja: 柳漢俊) (born July 1, 1981 in Gunpo, Gyeonggi-do) is a South Korean outfielder for the KT Wiz in the Korea Baseball Organization. He bats and throws right-handed.

Amateur career
After graduating from Yushin High School, Yoo was drafted by the Hyundai Unicorns in the second round (20th overall) of the 2000 KBO Draft. Yoo did not sign with them; instead he opted for college, attending Dongguk University. Yoo was a four-year starting third baseman for Dongguk University from -.

Notable international careers

Professional career
In , Yoo made his KBO pro league debut in the Hyundai Unicorns. The Unicorns assigned him to the Unicorns second team for the 2004 season.

Yoo was promoted to the first team in the  season but only batted .192 with 5 hits in 26 at-bats in 18 games.

After the 2005 season, Yoo converted his position to third baseman to outfielder. In , his first season as an outfielder, Yoo became a fixture in right field of the Unicorns.

In , Yoo hit .223 with 5 home runs and 35 RBI for the Unicorns. He missed the next two years due to military service.

In , Yoo returned to baseball with the Nexen Heroes. On May 19, Yoo gained notability with his performance against the SK Wyverns, tying the all-time single-game record for RBI. In that game, he drove in 8 runs, going 5-for-6 with 2 home runs. As a consistent full-time outfielder, Yoo finished the season with career-bests in all offensive categories, ranked 4th in the KBO league in at-bats (481), 7th in hits (140), 8th in doubles (27), 12th in RBI (79) and 22nd in batting average (.291). After the 2010 season, Yoo was selected for the South Korea national baseball team to compete in the Intercontinental Cup held in Taichung.

Notable international careers

External links 
 Profile and stats on the KBO official site

Kiwoom Heroes players
KT Wiz players
Hyundai Unicorns players
KBO League outfielders
South Korean baseball players
1981 births
Living people
People from Gunpo
Sportspeople from Gyeonggi Province